Mundoona is a locality in northern Victoria, Australia in the local government area of the Shire of Moira.

Yalca post office (in the Mundoona locality) opened on 9 September 1879, and closed on 23 August 1957. Mundoona State School post office opened in 1907, renamed Mundoona in 1907, and closed on 18 July 1952.

References

Towns in Victoria (Australia)
Shire of Moira